Rustom may refer to:
Rustom (film) (2016), a Bollywood film starring Akshay Kumar and Ileana D'Cruz
Rustom (1982 film), a Bollywood film starring Tanuja, Dara Singh and Rajendra Kumar
DRDO Rustom, an unmanned combat air vehicle
Elie Rustom (born 1987), Lebanese basketball player
Emile Rustom, Lebanese football manager
Paul Rustom (born 1983), Lebanese footballer
Rustom Jal Vakil (born 1911), Indian cardiologist
Rustom Khurshedji Karanjia (1912 –2008), Indian journalist and editor

See also
 Rustum (disambiguation)